Paul D'Amour (born May 17, 1967) is an American musician and was the first bass guitarist for Tool. His bass sound is recognized by the aggressive picked tone he developed with his Chris Squire Signature Rickenbacker 4001CS, which can be heard on Tool's first full-length album, Undertow. Since March 2019, he has been the bassist for industrial metal band Ministry.

Biography
D'Amour was born in Spokane, Washington. Originally a guitar player, D'Amour became Tool's bassist after being introduced to the band by guitarist Adam Jones. Like Jones, D'Amour was in Los Angeles because of his wish to enter the film industry. D'Amour built movie sets and worked in an art department on music videos and commercials.

D'Amour left Tool in 1995. According to drummer Danny Carey, D'Amour left the band because he wanted to play guitar rather than bass. D'Amour corroborated this in 2020 saying, "I always wanted to do other things, and it felt like I was too much in a box with that band ... I'm not just a bass player; I'm a creator, I wanted to have a bigger role, and it just wasn't happening in that situation." After his departure from the band, he formed the psychedelic pop band Lusk with Brad Laner, Chris Pitman (future member of Guns N' Roses), and Greg Edwards of Failure and Autolux. In 1997, they released their only album, entitled Free Mars.

Soon after his departure from Tool, D'Amour played guitar in a group named Replicants, a cover band that included Ken Andrews and Greg Edwards from Failure, as well as Chris Pitman. They released one self-titled album in 1995, with a guest appearance from former Tool bandmate Maynard James Keenan.

In early 2005, D'Amour wrote and performed under the name Feersum Ennjin. The name is inspired by the science fiction novel Feersum Endjinn by Iain Banks, an author whose novel The Wasp Factory was conceptual inspiration for Lusk as well. The project released a self-titled EP on Silent Uproar Records. In 2011, a self-titled LP was released on Dissociated Press, featuring some songs that had been released previously and some new ones. On the first track of the LP, "The Fourth", former Tool band-mate Danny Carey plays drums.

D'Amour also played bass in the band Lesser Key. The group consists of Andrew Zamudio (vocals), Brett Fanger (guitar), and Justin Hanson (drums). The band "represents an exploration into personal and artistic freedom." On July 26, 2013, the band released a video of their debut single "Intercession." Their debut EP was produced by former Tool producer Sylvia Massy and released on April 1, 2014 on Sumerian Records.

As of late March 2019, D'Amour joined Ministry as the band's newest bass player, replacing Tony Campos.

Selected discography
With Tool
 Opiate (1992)
 Undertow (1993)

With Replicants
 Replicants (1995)

With Lusk
 Free Mars (1997)

With Feersum Ennjin
 Feersum Ennjin (2011)

With Lesser Key
 Lesser Key (2014)

With Ministry 
 Moral Hygiene (2021)

References

External links
 
 
 Feersum Ennjin official band website
 Artist page on Silent Uproar Records
 

1967 births
20th-century American bass guitarists
21st-century American bass guitarists
Living people
American heavy metal bass guitarists
American male bass guitarists
Musicians from Spokane, Washington
Tool (band) members
Ministry (band) members
Replicants (band) members
Progressive metal bass guitarists
Alternative metal bass guitarists
American experimental musicians
Industrial metal musicians